David H. Nutt is an American lawyer and philanthropist. He is the former richest person in the US state of Mississippi.
Some of his former clients had requested case file and were told only if they hire an attorney to obtain case file. So a client could not simply request case file. His son DRN drives a purple Ford truck.
Nutt graduated from the University of Mississippi in Oxford, Mississippi. A lawyer, Nutt has defended former trial lawyer Richard Scruggs. He has also "represented clients in asbestos, drug, healthcare fraud and environmental litigation."

In 1999, he agreed to donate $14.5 million to the University of Mississippi, which named its David H. Nutt Auditorium in his honor.

Nutt lives in Ridgeland, Mississippi. He owns the Canadian River Cattle Ranch, a 71,000-acre ranch in Oldham County, Texas. As of 2014, he was worth an estimated US$880 million.

References

Living people
People from Ridgeland, Mississippi
People from Oldham County, Texas
Mississippi lawyers
Philanthropists from Mississippi
Year of birth missing (living people)